West Menlo Park is a census-designated place and an Unincorporated community in San Mateo County, California, located between the majority of City of Menlo Park, the Town of Atherton, the Sharon Heights neighborhood of Menlo Park and Stanford University (in Santa Clara County).  As of the 2020 census, the community had a population of 3,930.

The area consists of suburban housing and a small business district along Alameda de las Pulgas (literally, "Avenue of the Fleas"), often just referred to as "the Alameda", which extends the length of the Rancho de las Pulgas land granted to the Argüello family. West Menlo Park is served by the Las Lomitas School District and Menlo Park Fire District.

Geography
West Menlo Park has a mild climate.

Demographics

2010
The 2010 United States Census reported that West Menlo Park had a population of 3,659. The racial makeup of West Menlo Park was 2,983 (81.5%) White, 28 (0.8%) African American, 2 (0.1%) Native American, 416 (11.4%) Asian, 4 (0.1%) Pacific Islander, 52 (1.4%) from other races, and 174 (4.8%) from two or more races. Hispanic or Latino of any race were 201 persons (5.5%).

The Census reported that 3,650 people (99.8% of the population) lived in households, 5 (0.1%) lived in non-institutionalized group quarters, and 4 (0.1%) were institutionalized.

There were 1,356 households, out of which 574 (42.3%) had children under the age of 18 living in them, 830 (61.2%) were opposite-sex married couples living together, 98 (7.2%) had a female householder with no husband present, 42 (3.1%) had a male householder with no wife present.  There were 61 (4.5%) unmarried opposite-sex partnerships, and 11 (0.8%) same-sex married couples or partnerships. 292 households (21.5%) were made up of individuals, and 122 (9.0%) had someone living alone who was 65 years of age or older. The average household size was 2.69.  There were 970 families (71.5% of all households); the average family size was 3.17.

The population was spread out, with 1,069 people (29.2%) under the age of 18, 101 people (2.8%) aged 18 to 24, 998 people (27.3%) aged 25 to 44, 1,004 people (27.4%) aged 45 to 64, and 487 people (13.3%) who were 65 years of age or older.  The median age was 40.4 years. For every 100 females, there were 95.7 males.  For every 100 females age 18 and over, there were 91.1 males.

The homeowner vacancy rate was 0.9%; the rental vacancy rate was 5.3%.  2,999 people (82.0% of the population) lived in owner-occupied housing units and 651 people (17.8%) lived in rental housing units.

2000
As of the census of 2000, there were 3,629 people, 1,420 households, and 955 families residing in the CDP. The racial makeup of the CDP in 2010 was 77.6% non-Hispanic White, 0.7% non-Hispanic African American, 0.1% Native American, 11.4% Asian, 0.1% Pacific Islander, 0.3% from other races, and 4.3% from two or more races. Hispanic or Latino of any race were 5.5% of the population. 
There were 1,420 households, out of which 34.7% had children under the age of 18 living with them, 57.6% were married couples living together, 7.0% had a female householder with no husband present, and 32.7% were non-families. 25.0% of all households were made up of individuals, and 8.7% had someone living alone who was 65 years of age or older.  The average household size was 2.55 and the average family size was 3.04.

In the CDP, the population was spread out, with 25.3% under the age of 18, 3.6% from 18 to 24, 32.1% from 25 to 44, 25.8% from 45 to 64, and 13.3% who were 65 years of age or older.  The median age was 39 years. For every 100 females, there were 96.0 males.  For every 100 females age 18 and over, there were 91.1 males.

The median income for a household in the CDP was $125,881, and the median income for a family was $145,946. Males had a median income of $100,000+ versus $70,486 for females. The per capita income for the CDP was $62,302.  2.9% of the population and 0.4% of families were below the poverty line.   0.3% of those under the age of 18 
and 4.1% of those 65 and older were living below the poverty line.

Politics

Education
For primary schools, West Menlo Park is served by the Las Lomitas Elementary School District. For high school, West Menlo Park is served by the Sequoia Union High School District, with all of West Menlo Park falling into the boundaries of Menlo-Atherton High School.

References

External links
2000 Census Data

Census-designated places in San Mateo County, California
Unincorporated communities in California
Census-designated places in California
Unincorporated communities in San Mateo County, California